Great Southern Institute of Technology (also known as GSIT), is a Technical and Further Education (TAFE) institution based in Albany, Western Australia.

GSIT is the largest training provider in the Great Southern region of Western Australia. It operates at more than 10 sites, including four major campuses and provides 95% of the region's vocational education and training.

The primary campus is in the region's administrative center of Albany, located 418 km SE from the state capital Perth.

History
GSIT was officially opened on 1 November 1974 as Albany Technical School.

Industry Training Areas
 Art and Music
 Business, Management, and Finance
 Community, Children, and Education
 Environment and Rural
 Health and Aged Care
 IT, Media, and Design
 Literacy, Numeracy, and Languages
 Skills Development Center
 Tourism and Events Management
 Trades and Safety
 Training and Assessment

Qualifications
Great Southern Institute of Technology award courses are in line with the Australian Quality Training Framework (AQTF). The AQTF establishes standard titles and levels for courses across Australia.  The qualifications that are currently offered at GSIT include:
 Advanced Diploma
 Diploma
 Certificate IV
 Certificate III
 Certificate II
 Certificate I

Campuses
 Albany
 Denmark
 Katanning
 Mount Barker

External links

TAFE WA